The 1981 Grand Prix motorcycle racing season was the 33rd F.I.M. Road Racing World Championship season.

Season summary
In the 500cc world championship, two Suzuki teams fought for the title with Marco Lucchinelli riding for Roberto Gallina's Italian Suzuki team and, Randy Mamola riding for the Heron Suzuki team backed by the UK Suzuki importer. Mamola started the season strongly with two victories and two second-place finishes to take the lead in the championship but then, Lucchinelli took command with four victories in the next five races to claim the world championship. Mamola finished in second place for the second year in a row. 

Barry Sheene would win the final race of his career with a win in Sweden while a young American named Freddie Spencer made his first foray into the world championships as a member of the Honda factory racing team, riding the four-stroke Honda NR500 up to fifth place at the British Grand Prix before it suffered a mechanical failure.

Germany's Anton Mang scored double world championship victories, defeating defending champion Jon Ekerold for the 350cc title and, winning ten of twelve 250 events to take that title. Frenchman Michel Rougerie, who finished second in 1975 250 championship, was killed when he was hit by another rider after crashing in the 350 race in Yugoslavia. Angel Nieto won his tenth championship by winning eight of twelve rounds on his Minarelli while Ricardo Tormo won the 50cc crown for Bultaco.

Beginning in 1981, motorcycle frame technology evolved quickly as motorcycle manufacturers moved from the steel, featherbed frame chassis first developed in the 1950s, to aluminium frames featuring large, twin beams as first pioneered by Spanish constructor, Antonio Cobas.

1981 Grand Prix season calendar
The following Grands Prix were scheduled to take place in 1981:

Calendar changes
 The Argentine Grand Prix was added to the calendar.
 The Austrian Grand Prix returned on the calendar after a one-year absence. Last year's scheduled running of the event was cancelled due to snowy weather conditions on race week.
 The German Grand Prix was moved forward, from 24 August to 3 May.
 The German Grand Prix moved from the Nürburgring-Nordschleife to the Hockenheimring for the next three years due to ongoing construction to replace it with a new venue.
 The Nations Grand Prix moved from the Circuito Internazionale Santa Monica to the Autodromo Nazionale Monza.
 The Yugoslavian Grand Prix was moved forward, from 15 June to 31 May.
 The Belgian Grand Prix moved from Circuit Zolder to Circuit de Spa-Francorchamps after the track problems at Spa-Francorchamps were resolved.
 The San Marino Grand Prix was added to the calendar.
 The Finnish Grand Prix was moved back, from 27 July to 9 August.
 The Swedish Grand Prix was added to the calendar after a one-year absence.

Results and standings

1981 Grand Prix season results

500cc riders' standings
Scoring system
Points are awarded to the top ten finishers. A rider has to finish the race to earn points.
 

{|
|

350cc standings

250cc standings

125cc standings

50cc standings

Bibliography
 Büla, Maurice & Schertenleib, Jean-Claude (2001). Continental Circus 1949-2000. Chronosports S.A.

References

External links

Grand Prix motorcycle racing seasons
Grand Prix motorcycle racing season